Pterolophia mediocarinata is a species of beetle in the family Cerambycidae. It was described by Stephan von Breuning in 1939. It is known from Sumatra, Java and Borneo.

References

mediocarinata
Beetles described in 1939